Cumbric was a variety of the Common Brittonic language spoken during the Early Middle Ages in the Hen Ogledd or "Old North" in what is now the counties of Westmorland, Cumberland, northern Lancashire in Northern England and the southern Scottish Lowlands, alongside the Kingdom of Elmet in modern day Yorkshire. It was closely related to Old Welsh and the other Brittonic languages. Place name evidence suggests Cumbric may also have been spoken as far south as Pendle and the Yorkshire Dales. The prevailing view is that it became extinct in the 12th century, after the incorporation of the semi-independent Kingdom of Strathclyde into the Kingdom of Scotland.

Problems with terminology

Dauvit Broun sets out the problems with the various terms used to describe the Cumbric language and its speakers. The people seem to have called themselves  the same way that the Welsh called themselves  (most likely from reconstructed Brittonic  meaning "fellow countrymen"). The Welsh and the Cumbric-speaking people of what are now southern Scotland and northern England probably felt they were actually one ethnic group. The Norse called them . In Medieval Latin, the English term Welsh became  ("of Wales"), while the term  referred to Cumbrians ("of Cumbria"). However, in Scots, a Cumbric speaker seems to have been called  – from the Scots  "Welsh".

The Latinate term Cambria is often used for Wales; nevertheless, the Life of St Kentigern ( 1200) by Jocelyn of Furness has the following passage:

John T. Koch defined the specifically Cumbric region as "the area approximately between the line of the River Mersey and the Forth-Clyde Isthmus", but went on to include evidence from the Wirral Peninsula in his discussion and did not define its easterly extent. Kenneth H. Jackson described Cumbric as "the Brittonic dialect of Cumberland, Westmorland, northern Lancashire, and south-west Scotland" and went on to define the region further as being bound in the north by the Firth of Clyde, in the south by the River Ribble and in the east by the Southern Scottish Uplands and the Pennine Ridge.

Available evidence

The evidence from Cumbric comes almost entirely through secondary sources, since no known contemporary written records of the language survive. The majority of evidence comes from place names of the north of England and the south of Scotland. Other sources include the personal names of Strathclyde Britons in Scottish, Irish, and Anglo-Saxon sources, and a few Cumbric words surviving into the High Middle Ages in southwest Scotland as legal terms. Although the language is long extinct, traces of its vocabulary arguably have persisted into the modern era in the form of "counting scores" and in a handful of dialectal words.

From this scanty evidence, little can be deduced about the singular characteristics of Cumbric, not even the name by which its speakers referred to it. However, linguists generally agree that Cumbric was a Western Brittonic language closely related to Welsh and, more distantly, to Cornish and Breton.

Around the time of the battle described in the poem Y Gododdin, c. 600, Common Brittonic is believed to have been transitioning into its daughter languages: Cumbric in North Britain, Old Welsh in Wales, and Southwestern Brittonic, the ancestor of Cornish and Breton. Kenneth Jackson concludes that the majority of changes that transformed British into Primitive Welsh belong to the period from the middle of the fifth to the end of the sixth century. This involved syncope and the loss of final syllables. If the poem ultimately dates to this time, it would have originally been written in an early form of Cumbric, the usual name for the Brythonic speech of the Hen Ogledd; Jackson suggested the name "Primitive Cumbric" for the dialect spoken at the time. However, scholars date the poem to between the 7th and the early 11th centuries, and the earliest surviving manuscript of it dates to the 13th, written in Old Welsh and Middle Welsh.

Place names
Cumbric place-names occur in Scotland south of the firths of Forth and Clyde. Brittonic names north of this line are Pictish. Cumbric names are also found commonly in the historic county of Cumberland and in bordering areas of Northumberland. They are less common in Westmorland, east Northumberland, and Durham, with some in Lancashire and the adjoining areas of North Yorkshire. Approaching Cheshire, late Brittonic placenames are probably better characterised as Welsh rather than as Cumbric. As noted below, however, any clear distinction between Cumbric and Welsh is difficult to prove. Many Brittonic place-names remain in these regions which should not be described as Cumbric, such as Leeds, Manchester and York, because they were coined in a period before Brittonic split into Cumbric and its sister dialects.

Some of the principal towns and cities of the region have names of Cumbric origin, including:
Bathgate, West Lothian: meaning 'boar wood' (Welsh  'wild boar' +  'forest, wood').
The Welsh form  is derived by regular sound changes from the Romano-British name.
Glasgow, Scotland: widely believed to derive from words cognate with Welsh  'green hollow' (possibly that below Glasgow Cathedral).
Lanark, Lanarkshire: from the equivalent of Welsh  'glade, clearing'.
Penicuik, Midlothian: from words meaning 'hill of the cuckoo' (W. ).
Penrith, Cumbria: meaning 'chief ford' (Welsh  'head, chief' +  'ford').

Several supposed Cumbric elements occur repeatedly in place names of the region. The following table lists some of them according to the modern Welsh equivalent:

Some Cumbric names have historically been replaced by Scottish Gaelic, Middle English, or Scots equivalents, and in some cases the different forms occur in the historical record.
Falkirk similarly has several alternative medieval forms meaning 'speckled church':  etc. from Cumbric (Welsh );  etc. from Gaelic (modern Gaelic );  etc. from Scots (in turn from Old English ).

Counting systems

Among the evidence that Cumbric might have influenced local English dialects are a group of counting systems, or scores, recorded in various parts of northern England. Around 100 of these systems have been collected since the 18th century; the scholarly consensus is that these derive from a Brittonic language closely related to Welsh. Though they are often referred to as "sheep-counting numerals", most recorded scores were not used to count sheep, but in knitting or for children's games or nursery rhymes. These scores are often suggested to represent a survival from medieval Cumbric, a theory first popularized in the 19th century. However, later scholars came to reject this idea, suggesting instead that the scores were later imports from either Wales or Scotland, but in light of the dearth of evidence one way or another, Markku Filppula, Juhani Klemola, and Heli Paulasto posit that it remains plausible that the counting systems are indeed of Cumbric origin.

Cumbric, in common with other Brythonic languages, uses a vigesimal counting system, i.e. numbering up to twenty, with intermediate numbers for ten and fifteen. Therefore, after numbering one to ten, numbers follow the format one-and-ten, two-and-ten etc. to fifteen, then one-and-fifteen, two-and-fifteen to twenty. The dialect words for the numbers themselves show much variation across the region. (see chart)

Scots and English
A number of words occurring in the Scots and Northern English variants of English have been proposed as being of possible Brittonic origin. Ascertaining the real derivation of these words is far from simple, due in part to the similarities between some cognates in the Brittonic and Goidelic languages and the fact that borrowing took place in both directions between these languages.

Another difficulty lies with other words which were taken into Old English, as in many cases it is impossible to tell whether the borrowing is directly from Brittonic or not (e.g. Brogat, Crag, below). The following are possibilities:
 Bach – 'cowpat' (cf. Welsh  'dung', Gaelic )
 Baivenjar – 'mean fellow' (Welsh  'scoundrel')
 Brat – 'apron'. The word appears in Welsh (with meanings 'rag, cloth' and 'pinafore'), Scots and northern English dialects, but may be an Old English borrowing from Old Irish.
 Brogat – a type of mead (Welsh  'bragget' – also found in Chaucer)
 Coble – a type of small, flat-bottomed boat (also in Northeast England), akin to Welsh ceubal 'a hollow' and Latin caupulus; distinct from the round-bottomed coracle.
 Crag – 'rocks'. Either from Brittonic (Welsh ) or Goidelic (Scottish Gaelic ).
 Croot – 'small boy' (Welsh , Gaelic  'small person', 'humpback/hunchback')
 Croude – a type of small harp or lyre (as opposed to the larger ; Welsh  'bowed lyre', later 'fiddle', Gaelic )
 Lum – Scottish word for 'chimney' (Middle Welsh )

Equivalence with Old Welsh
The linguistic term Cumbric is defined according to geographical rather than linguistic criteria: that is, it refers to the variety of Brittonic spoken within a particular region of North Britain and implies nothing about that variety except that it was geographically distinct from other varieties. This has led to a discussion about the nature of Cumbric and its relationship with other Brittonic languages, in particular with Old Welsh.

Linguists appear undecided as to whether Cumbric should be considered a separate language, or a dialect of Old Welsh. Koch calls it a dialect but goes on to say that some of the place names in the Cumbric region "clearly reflect a developed medieval language, much like Welsh, Cornish or Breton". Jackson also calls it a dialect but points out that "to call it Pr[imitive] W[elsh] would be inaccurate", so clearly views it as distinct in some meaningful respect.

It has been suggested that Cumbric was more closely aligned to the Pictish language than to Welsh, though there is considerable debate regarding the classification of that language. On the basis of place name evidence it has also been proposed that all three languages were very similar.

The whole question is made more complex because there is no consensus as to whether any principled distinction can be made between languages and dialects.

Below, some of the proposed differences between Cumbric and Old Welsh are discussed.

Retention of Brittonic *rk
Lanark and Lanercost are thought to contain the equivalent of Welsh llannerch 'clearing'.

There is evidence to the contrary, however, including the place names Powmaughan and Maughanby (containing Welsh Meirchion) and the word kelchyn (related to Welsh cylch). Jackson concludes that the change of Common Brittonic *rk >  "may have been somewhat later in Cumbric".

Retention of Brittonic *mb
There is evidence to suggest that the consonant cluster mb remained distinct in Cumbric later than the time it was assimilated to mm in Welsh, Cornish, and Breton. The cluster remains in:
 Old English Cumbraland "land of Cumbrians" (from Common Brittonic *kombrogi, whence Welsh Cymru "Wales" also originates).
 Crombocwater and Crombokwatre, two 14th-century records of Crummock Water and Crombok an 1189 record for Crummack Dale in Yorkshire (from Common Brittonic *Crumbāco- "curved one" (W crwm "curved")).
 Cam Beck, the name of a stream in north Cumbria recorded as Camboc (1169) and believed to be from Common Brittonic *Cambāco- "crooked stream" (W cam, CB kamm).
 Crimple Beck, Yorkshire, which is said to derive from Common Brittonic. *Crumbopull- "crooked pool". Here the b is assumed to have survived late enough to cause provection.

Jackson notes that only in the north does the cluster appear in place names borrowed after circa 600AD and concludes that it may have been a later dialectal survival here.

Syncope
Jackson notes the legal term galnys, equivalent to Welsh galanas, may show syncope of internal syllables to be a feature of Cumbric. Further evidence is wanting, however.

Devoicing
James mentions that devoicing appears to be a feature of many Cumbric place names. Devoicing of word final consonants is a feature of modern Breton and, to an extent, Cornish. Watson notes initial devoicing in Tinnis Castle (in Drumelzier) (compare Welsh dinas 'fortress, city') as an example of this, which can also be seen in the Cornish Tintagel, din 'fort'. Also notable are the different English names of two Welsh towns named Dinbych ('little fort'); Denbigh and Tenby.

There is also a significant number of place names which do not support this theory. Devoke Water and Cumdivock (< Dyfoc, according to Ekwall) and Derwent (< Common Brittonic Derwentiō) all have initial . The name Calder (< Brit. *Caletodubro-) in fact appears to show a voiced Cumbric consonant where Welsh has Calettwr by provection, which Jackson believes reflects an earlier stage of pronunciation. This can be seen in names with c, k, ck (e.g. Cocker < Brittonic *kukro-, Eccles < Brittonic eglēsia).

Loss of 
The Cumbric personal names Gospatrick, Gososwald and Gosmungo meaning 'servant of St...' (Welsh, Cornish, Breton gwas 'servant, boy') and the Galloway dialect word gossock 'short, dark haired inhabitant of Wigtownshire' (W. gwasog 'a servant') apparently show that the Cumbric equivalent of Welsh and Cornish gwas & B gwaz 'servant' was *gos. Jackson suggests that it may be a survival of the original Proto-Celtic form of the word in –o- (i.e. *uɸo-sto).

This idea is disputed by the Dictionary of the Scots Language; and the occurrence in Gospatrick's Writ of the word wassenas 'dependants', thought to be from the same word gwas, is evidence against Jackson's theory. Koch notes that the alternation between gwa- and go- is common among the Brittonic languages and does not amount to a systematic sound change in any of them.

Thomas Clancy opined that the royal feminine personal name in Life of Kentigern, Languoreth, demonstrates the presence of /gw/ Cumbric.

It is noteworthy that the toponym Brenkibeth in Cumberland (now Burntippet; possibly bryn, "hill" + gwyped, "gnats") may display this syllable anglicized as -k-. The name, however, may not be Brittonic at all, and instead be of Scandinavian origin.

Semantics of Penn
In the Book of Aneirin, a poem entitled  "Peis Dinogat"  (possibly set in the Lake District of Cumbria), contains a usage of the word penn "head" (attached to the names of several animals hunted by the protagonist), that is unique in medieval Welsh literature and may, according to Koch, reflect Cumbric influence ("[r]eferring to a single animal in this way is otherwise found only in Breton, and we have no evidence that the construction ever had any currency in the present-day Wales"). The relevant lines are:

Pan elei dy dat ty e vynyd
Dydygei ef penn ywrch penn gwythwch penn hyd
Penn grugyar vreith o venyd
Penn pysc o rayadyr derwennyd

Translated as:

 When your father went to [the] mountain
 He brought a head of buck, head of wild pig, head of stag
 Head of speckled grouse from [the] mountain
 Head of fish from [the] falls of Derwent

The form derwennydd however, is at odds with the absence of the ending -ydd noted below.

It is to be noted, however, that such semantics are probably archaisms, and rather than being features diagnostic of linguistic distinctiveness, are more likely to be legacies of features once common to all Brittonic speech.

Definite article
The modern Brittonic languages have different forms of the definite article: Welsh yr, -'r, y, Cornish an, and Breton an, ar, al. These are all taken to derive from an unstressed form of the Common Brittonic demonstrative *sindos, altered by assimilation (compare the Gaelic articles). Throughout Old Welsh the article is ir (or -r after a vowel), but there is evidence in Cumbric for an article in -n alongside one in -r. Note the following:

Tallentire, Cumbria (Talentir 1200–25): 'brow/end of the land' (Welsh tal y tir)
Triermain, Cumbria (Trewermain, Treverman c 1200): 'homestead at the stone' (Welsh tre(f) y maen)
Treales, Lancashire (Treueles 1086): possibly 'village of the court' (Welsh tre(f) y llys). But note Treflys, Powys which has no article.
Pen-y-Ghent, Yorkshire (Penegent 1307):  'hill of the border country' (Welsh pen y gaint). The final element is disputed. Ekwall says it is identical to Kent (< Br *Kantion), which is related to Welsh cant 'rim, border', though Mills gives 'coastal district' or 'land of the hosts or armies' for the county.
Traquair, Borders (Treverquyrd 1124):  'homestead on the River Quair' (Welsh tre(f) y Quair).
Penicuik, Midlothian (Penicok 1250):  'hill of the cuckoo' (Welsh pen y cog)
Liscard, Wirral Peninsula (Lisenecark 1260): possibly 'court of the rock' (Welsh llys y garreg), but also suggested is Irish lios na carraige of identical meaning.

Absence of -ydd
Of all the names of possible Cumbric derivation, few are more certain than Carlisle and Derwent which can be directly traced back to their Romano-British recorded forms Luguvalium and Derventio.

The modern and medieval forms of Carlisle (Luel c1050, Cardeol 1092, Karlioli c1100 (in the Medieval Latin genitive case), Cærleoil 1130) and Derwent (Deorwentan stream c890 (Old English), Derewent) suggest derivations from Br *Luguvaljon and *Derwentjō. But the Welsh forms Caerliwelydd and Derwennydd are derived from alternative forms *Luguvalijon, *Derwentijō which gave the -ydd ending. This appears to show a divergence between Cumbric and Welsh at a relatively early date.

If this was an early dialectal variation, it can't be applied as a universal sound law, as the equivalent of W mynydd 'mountain' occurs in a number of Cumbric names with the spirant intact: E.g. Mindrum (Minethrum 1050) from 'mountain ridge' (Welsh mynydd trum). It might also be noted that Medieval Welsh forms of Caerliwelydd
and Derwennydd both occur in poems of supposed Cumbrian origin whose rhyme and metre would be disrupted if the ending were absent.

Of additional relevance is that Guto Rhys demonstrated "some robust proof" of the presence of the -ydd ending in the closely-aligned Pictish language.

Use of the name element Gos-

The most well-known example of this Cumbric naming practice is Gospatric, which occurs as the name of several notable Anglo-Scottish noblemen in the 11th and 12th centuries. Other examples, standardised from original sources, include Gosmungo (Saint Mungo), Gososwald (Oswald of Northumbria) and Goscuthbert (Cuthbert).

Date of extinction
It is impossible to give an exact date of the extinction of Cumbric. However, there are some pointers which may give a reasonably accurate estimate. In the mid-11th century, some landowners still bore what appear to be Cumbric names. Examples of such landowners are Dunegal (Dyfnwal), lord of Strathnith or Nithsdale; Moryn (Morien), lord of Cardew and Cumdivock near Carlisle; and Eilifr (Eliffer), lord of Penrith.

There is a village near Carlisle called Cumwhitton (earlier Cumquinton). This appears to contain the Norman name Quinton, affixed to a cognate of the Welsh cwm, meaning valley. There were no Normans in this area until 1069 at the earliest.

In the Battle of the Standard in 1138, the Cumbrians are noted as a separate ethnic group. Given that their material culture was very similar to their Gaelic and Anglian neighbours, it is arguable that what set them apart was still their language. Also the castle at Castle Carrock – Castell Caerog – dates from around 1160–1170. Barmulloch, earlier Badermonoc (Cumbric "monk's dwelling"), was given to the church by Malcolm IV of Scotland between 1153 and 1165.

A more controversial point is the surname Wallace. It means "Welshman". It is possible that all the Wallaces in the Clyde area were medieval immigrants from Wales, but given that the term was also used for local Cumbric-speaking Strathclyde Welsh, it seems equally, if not more, likely that the surname refers to people who were seen as being "Welsh" due to their Cumbric language.

Surnames in Scotland were not inherited before 1200 and not regularly until 1400. Sir William Wallace (known in Gaelic as Uilleam Breatnach – namely William the Briton or Welshman) came from the Renfrew area – itself a Cumbric name. Wallace slew the sheriff of Lanark (also a Cumbric name) in 1297. Even if he had inherited the surname from his father, it is possible that the family spoke Cumbric within memory in order to be thus named.

There are also some historical pointers to a continuing separate ethnic identity. Prior to being crowned king of Scotland in 1124, David I was invested with the title Prince of the Cumbrians. William the Lion between 1173 and 1180 made an address to his subjects, identifying the Cumbrians as a separate group. This does not prove that any of them still spoke Cumbric at this time.

The legal documents in the Lanercost Cartulary, dating from the late 12th century, show witnesses with Norman French or English names, and no obvious Cumbric names. Though these people represent the upper classes, it seems significant that by the late 12th century in the Lanercost area, Cumbric is not obvious in these personal names. In 1262 in Peebles, jurymen in a legal dispute over peat cutting also have names which mostly appear Norman French or English, but possible exceptions are Gauri Pluchan, Cokin Smith and Robert Gladhoc, where Gladhoc has the look of an adjectival noun similar to Welsh "gwladog" = "countryman". In the charters of Wetherall Priory near Carlisle there is a monk called Robert Minnoc who appears as a witness to 8 charters dating from around 1260. His name is variously spelled Minnoc/Minot/Mynoc and it is tempting to see an equivalent of the Welsh "mynach" – "Robert the Monk" here.

Given that in other areas which have given up speaking Celtic languages, the upper classes have generally become Anglicised before the peasantry, it is not implausible that the peasantry continued to speak Cumbric for at least a little while after. Around 1200 there is a list of the names of men living in the area of Peebles. Amongst them are Cumbric names such as Gospatrick: servant or follower of Saint Patrick, Gosmungo: servant of Saint Mungo, Guososwald: servant of Oswald of Northumbria and Goscubrycht: servant of Cuthbert. Two of the saints – Oswald and Cuthbert — are from Northumbria showing influence on Cumbric not found in Welsh.

The royal seal of Alexander III of Scotland (who reigned 4 September 1241 – 19 March 1286) bore the title "Rex Scotorum et Britanniarum", or "King of Scots and Britons".

In 1305 Edward I of England prohibited the Leges inter Brettos et Scottos. The term Brets or Britons refers to the native, traditionally Cumbric speaking people of southern Scotland and northern England as well as the Pictish speakers in Northern Scotland.

It seems that Cumbric could well have survived into the middle of the 12th century as a community language and even lasted into the 13th on the tongues of the last remaining speakers. Certain areas seem to be particularly dense in Cumbric place-names even down to very minor features. The two most striking of these are around Lanercost east of Carlisle and around Torquhan south of Edinburgh. If the 1262 names from Peebles do contain traces of Cumbric personal names then we can imagine Cumbric dying out between 1250 and 1300 at the very latest.

See also
Cumbrian dialect
Cumbrian toponymy
Kenneth H. Jackson
Kingdom of Strathclyde

Notes

References

External links 
 Cumbric.org - Language and History

Attempted revival

</ref>

Languages attested from the 6th century
Languages extinct in the 12th century
Western Brittonic languages
Extinct Celtic languages
Extinct languages of Scotland
Languages of the United Kingdom
Unsolved problems in linguistics
History of Cumbria
History of the Scottish Borders
Medieval languages
Languages of England
Languages of Scotland
North West England
Hen Ogledd